The Bennington Senate District is one of 16 districts of the Vermont Senate. The current district plan is included in the redistricting and reapportionment plan developed by the Vermont General Assembly following the 2020 U.S. Census, which applies to legislatures elected in 2022, 2024, 2026, 2028, and 2030.

The Bennington district includes all of Addison County and Buel's Gore and the unorganized town of Somerset and the town of Wilmington from Windham County.

As of the 2010 census, the state as a whole had a population of 625,741. As there are a total of 30 Senators, there were 20,858 residents per senator.

As of the 2000 census, the state as a whole had a population of 608,827. As there are a total of 30 Senators, there were 20,294 residents per senator.  The Bennington District had a population of 39,219 in that same census.  The district is apportioned two senators. This equals 19,610 residents per senator, 3.37% below the state average.

District Senators

As of 2018, from Vermont General Assembly website.
 Brian Campion, Democrat
 Dick Sears Jr., Democrat

Candidates for 2018
The following information was obtained from the Vermont Secretary of State website.

Towns and cities in the Addison district

Bennington County 
Arlington
Bennington
Dorset
Glastenbury
Landgrove
Manchester
Peru
Pownal
Readsboro
Rupert
Sandgate
Searsburg
Shaftsbury
Stamford
Sunderland
Winhall
Woodford

Windham County
Somerset
Wilmington

Towns and cities in the Bennington District, 2002–2012 elections

Bennington County 

 Arlington
 Bennington
 Dorset
 Glastenbury
 Landgrove
 Manchester
 Peru
 Pownal
 Readsboro
 Rupert
 Sandgate
 Searsburg
 Shaftsbury
 Stamford
 Sunderland
 Winhall
 Woodford

Windham County

 Wilmington

See also 
Bennington Vermont Senate District, 2002-2012
Vermont Senate districts, 2012–2022

References

External links

 Redistricting information from Vermont Legislature
 2002 and 2012 Redistricting information from Vermont Legislature
 Map of Vermont Senate districts and statistics (PDF) 2002–2012

Bennington County, Vermont
Vermont Senate districts